Robert Brian Norris is the 13th Sheriff of Kootenai County, Idaho. He defeated the Independent candidate for sheriff, Mike Bauer, in the 2020 Kootenai County Sheriff race, making him the first Kootenai County Sheriff-elect to not have any prior connection with the Kootenai County Sheriff's Office. Before becoming Sheriff, he was a lieutenant with the Los Angeles County Sheriff's Department.

Career at the LASD 

During Norris’s career at the Los Angeles County Sheriff's Department, his assignments included patrol, custody, narcotics, gangs, investigations, counter-terrorism, and emergency preparedness. Norris also graduated from the LASO's Leadership Certification program.

After 9/11 Norris was selected to lead a team at the newly created Joint Regional Intelligence Center to assist the United States during the war on terror. Norris held an SCI and was responsible for managing personnel and resources from local, state, and federal agencies such as the FBI, CIA, and the US Attorney's Office while under the direction of Condoleezza Rice. After leaving the JRIC, he was promoted to Lieutenant at the LASD by former Los Angeles Sheriff, Lee Baca.

Since Norris's career at the Los Angeles Sheriff's Dept, he's been a volunteer for the Kootenai County Search and Rescue team from mid-2017 to late-2019, and was put on administrative leave due to political interference.

Kootenai County Sheriff 
Norris was appointed to the office on January 1, 2021. Due to his predecessor leaving the office early, he was appointed unanimously by the Kootenai County board of commissioners. He started his appointed term as Sheriff on January 1, 2021, and ended on January 10, 2021. He was officially sworn in as the elected Kootenai County Sheriff on January 11, 2021.

Reforms and controversy 

North Idaho Exposed Incident

In Norris's first month as Kootenai County Sheriff, a video surfaced online of him pulling out pepper spray while talking to a man who was recording a traffic stop. It appeared to show Brad Nelson, a citizen of Kootenai County, asking questions regarding a traffic stop. After Nelson got, what looked about, 15 feet away from the stop, so Lt. Higgins and Norris could hear his questions, Norris approached Nelson and asked him to step back. Nelson was apprehensive and told Norris to, "Shut the fuck up and get back to work." Norris stepped closer to Nelson and grabbed pepper spray from out of his belt, and told him loudly if he didn't step back he would use it. Nelson moved back.

Nelson, after the confrontation, gave the video he had recorded to Casey Whalen, a self-described independent journalist. Whalen then uploaded Nelson's video to his YouTube channel with over 16,000 subscribers. The video got upwards of 20,000 views in the first week it had been uploaded. Many local papers and news stations covered the altercation, making the video go increasingly viral. After the video had received 30,000 views, and many of his critics attacking him for the way he handled himself, Norris released a public statement saying, "The idea of local citizens using their video cameras with the intention of harassing our local officers and interfering with their duties, only to get characterized later online as if we were in the wrong, contributes toward this national disgrace." Many residents felt as if his response to the incident lacked compassion and was worse than his actual behavior during the altercation. The video has now received 40,000 views.

COVID-19 Pandemic

Norris's response to the COVID-19 pandemic sought to make sure that law enforcement had little to no say, on what happens between "you and your doctor". The office's position was not particularly stated, however, Norris did campaign on an anti-mask rhetoric. On the day he was officially sworn in as the elected Sheriff, he released a press statement saying that he would not enforce dictates on healthy citizens; however, he never specifically mentioned mask enforcement nor COVID restrictions.

Although he never mentioned COVID-19 by name, people took it as his way of saying he would not force or mandate anyone to follow guidelines set in place by Governor Brad Little. This was a widely accepted position by many residents of Kootenai County.

2020 Kootenai County Sheriff race

Campaign 
Primary race

In late-2018, Norris announced he would run for Kootenai County Sheriff. Several potential Republican sheriff candidates, including KCSO Captain Kim Edmondson, Businessman John Grimm, former U.S. prosecutor Scott Jones, former house representative John Green and retired Texas officer Richard Whitehead, all announced their campaigns shortly after one another. As Jones's sheriff campaign failed to gain traction during the summer of 2019, he was pressured to drop out and make the Kootenai County Sheriff race less crowded. On July 11, 2019, Jones officially dropped out of the Sheriff's race and announced the next day that he intended to endorse Norris. John Green, however, which many presumed to be the front runner, never really dropped out of the race. Green had been silent for a couple of months regarding his Sheriff campaign but became officially disqualified after he was convicted in January 2020, for trying to defraud the United States. Green's name never appeared on the ballot. That opened a doorway for Richard Whitehead, who would run on somewhat of a tea party platform, which many former Green supporters found appealing, since, Green did as well. Captain Kim Edmondson and businessman John Grimm joined the race as the moderate Republicans. Many local Kootenai County residents found Edmondson's campaign attractive since she was the only candidate that had law enforcement experience with-in the Kootenai County Sheriff's Office.

As the primary election got closer, the race for Sheriff became much more aggressive politically; one campaign had even begun being investigated by the FBI. Many noted that this Sheriff election seemed much more divisive than the past ones. Sheriff Wolfinger agreeing with that sentiment but also noting that this isn't the first time a Sheriff's election had become so polarized.

Many speculated that Edmondson would win the Republican primary nomination, many people seemed to have supported and campaigned for her. Even Sheriff Wolfinger had stated his support for the Edmondson campaign. But, weeks before the election, Gov. Brad Little declared a state of emergency due to the COVID-19 pandemic, making it so Idaho voters had to request an absentee ballot in order to vote in the primary election. Driving down the turnout rate for primary elections throughout the state of Idaho. Knowing that, Norris seized on the opportunity to gain votes and was able to get the phone numbers of people who had requested absentee ballots; he called over 9,000 individual people in an effort to try to convince them to vote for him. When election day arrived, Norris had won with nearly 3,000 more votes over Edmondson, making him the Republican candidate for Sheriff.

General election

With many Kootenai County residents regarding the Sheriff's primary election as one of the most divisive Kootenai County elections in modern history, most presumed that the general Sheriff election would be a breath of fresh air for voters of Kootenai County.

Mike Bauer, a former Captain at the Los Angeles Sheriff's Department decided to file his paperwork for Kootenai County Sheriff in the spring of 2019. Many speculated his reason for joining the already crowded race, and why he had filed with a non-partisan affiliation. In an interview Bauer did, when asked why he was running for Sheriff, he said, "I’m not —- impressed with the 4 candidates that are running, especially one that seems to have a —- unverified background.” Voters later realized that Bauer was referring to Norris. Bauer had alleged, among many other things, that Norris was involved in a massive pay-to-play scandal while working at the LASD. Although Norris denied these claims, Bauer's campaign had substantial proof that Norris had donated $600 dollars to Paul Tanaka’s Mayor of Gardena campaign, which was a city Norris never resided in. The LASD pay-to-play scandal alleges that Tanaka worked with former L.A. Sheriff Lee Baca to promote those who had donated to Tanaka’s mayoral campaign. Norris did in fact receive a promotion, however, it was 6 years later after the original donation.

Although Bauer wasn't running during the primary, even at that time it had already been established that Norris believed that his main threat was Bauer. They had worked in the same agency, they knew the same people and had both worked under LASD, convicted felon, Sheriff Baca. Bauer had used this fact to his advantage, posting documents and photographs with the Sheriff he worked with before Baca, Sherman Block, which Norris never had worked for. Norris, knowing that Bauer had also worked under Baca, contacted L.A. Sheriff photographer, Jaime Lopez, and asked him if he could have access to Bauer's personnel file, since Bauer had a flood and Norris was asked to assist him in restoring documents and images that had been lost in this flood. In reality, there had been no flood; Norris had been attempting to gain photographs which showed Bauer and Baca together.

At the end of the Bauer campaign, Bauer had received support from Spokane County Sheriff Ozzie Knezovich and previous Kootenai County Sheriff Pierce Clegg, and had driven up the support for a non-partisan Sheriff office. Which the Kootenai County BOCC would soon consider after the general election.

Justin Nagel, a carpenter and Kootenai County native, decided he'd file as well. He campaigned as the only "born and raised" Idahoan candidate that had been in the race for Kootenai County Sheriff. He ran on the Libertarian ticket and received just over 8,000 votes in the general election.

2020 Election results 
Official Results from the Kootenai County Clerk's Office. Sheriff candidates are listed individually below if they received more than 0.1% of the overall vote.

Official Results from the Kootenai County Clerk's Office.

Personal life
Norris's wife is Susan Mel. Norris has had a total of three children with his past spouses and is a step-father to Susan Mel's children. Norris and his family live in Post Falls, Idaho.

References

External links 

 www.norris2020.com – official campaign website
 www.kcsheriff.com/Command-Staff -  KCSO Command Staff

Idaho sheriffs
1963 births
Living people